The men's 4×100 meter medley relay took place on 20–21 August at the Olympic Aquatic Centre of the Athens Olympic Sports Complex in Athens, Greece.

The U.S. team added two new world records to the books in the final men's event of the Olympic swimming program. Aaron Peirsol, Brendan Hansen, Ian Crocker, and Jason Lezak lowered their time set at the 2003 FINA World Championships in Barcelona, Spain, stopping the clock in 3:30.68. At the opening of the race, Peirsol led off a backstroke leg with a new world record of 53.45, beating a 0.15-second mark set by Lenny Krayzelburg (53.60) from the Pan Pacific Championships in 1999.

Meanwhile, the Germans earned a silver medal in a European record of 3:33.62, 11-hundredths of a second under the old Olympic record set by Team USA in 2000. Japan finished third in 3:35.22 to hold off the strong Russian team anchored by double Olympic champion Alexander Popov, who made up more than 1.5 seconds, but fell short of a medal in his last Olympic final.

Records
Prior to this competition, the existing world and Olympic records were as follows.

The following new world and Olympic records were set during this competition.

Results

Heats

Final

References

External links
Official Olympic Report

M
4 × 100 metre medley relay
Men's events at the 2004 Summer Olympics